The 2011 Dutch Figure Skating Championships took place between 17 and 19 December 2010 in Groningen. Skaters competed in the disciplines of men's singles and ladies' singles on the senior and junior level, and pair skating for the junior level.

Senior results

Men

Ladies

External links
 results

2011
2011 in figure skating
2010 in figure skating
Figure Skating Championships,2011
Sports competitions in Groningen (city)